William Shields may refer to:

 William "Chip" Shields (born 1967), American politician
 William Bayard Shields (1780–1823), United States federal judge
 William Emmet Shields (1861-1893), lawyer and New York State legislator
 William Ernest Shields (1892–1921), Canadian First World War flying ace
 William G. Shields or Jehst (born 1979), English rapper
 William Joseph Shields or Barry Fitzgerald (1888–1961), Irish actor
 William Shields, elected councillor in the 2002 Rugby Borough Council election
 Billy Shields (born 1954), American football player

See also
 Will Shields (born 1971), American football player
 William Shields Goodwin (1866–1937), American politician
 William Shield (1748–1829), English composer, violinist and violist
 William H. Shield (1878–1939), Canadian politician
 William Shiels (1848–1904), Australian colonial-era politician